Barnes Bluff is a projecting portion of the Jones Bluffs,  north-northeast of Eckman Bluff on the east side of Bear Peninsula, Walgreen Coast, Marie Byrd Land. It was mapped by the United States Geological Survey from surveys and from U.S. Navy aerial photographs taken in 1966, and named by the Advisory Committee on Antarctic Names in 1977 after Lieutenant Commander John O. Barnes, U.S. Navy, Air Operations Officer, Operation Deep Freeze, 1975–76 and 1976–77, and officer in charge of the NSFA winter detachment at McMurdo Station, 1977.

References 

Cliffs of Marie Byrd Land